Phatfish (1994–2014) were a Christian rock, CCM and worship band. They lived in Brighton, England and spent twenty years writing and performing their own brand of worship-oriented rock, as well as leading worship both in the UK and across the world. They released a number of their own albums and played alongside many well-known worship leaders. They also appeared on many worship albums and on national television programmes such as BBC1's Songs of Praise. Their home church was Church of Christ The King, home of Stuart Townend and other prominent Christian figures.

Their worship songs such as "Holy, Holy", "There is a Day" and "Amazing God" are sung in churches globally and have been featured on many albums. On the release of their compilation 15: The Anniversary Collection in 2008, their record label described it as "highlighting the incredible contribution that the band have made to the UK Christian music scene".

Phatfish's song "Holy Holy" has been played over 124,000 times on YouTube and the track "In Christ Alone", with Phatfish playing and Lou Fellingham leading alongside Stuart Townend, has been played over 5.7 million times.

Band members

Lou Fellingham (1994–2014) was the lead vocalist and occasional songwriter for the band. She is recognised for her distinctive and powerful voice that has been described as "wistful", "soaring" and "angelic". She has a solo career, and has continued to work with the other ex-members of Phatfish.

Nathan Fellingham (1994–2014), married to Lou, was the drummer and principal songwriter for the band. His worship songs Holy, Holy, There Is A Day, Amazing God, O God of Love (written with Lou Fellingham) and Awake, Awake, O Zion are sung in congregations all over the world. He was usually heavily involved in producing the Phatfish albums, often alongside others such as Alan Shacklock, Julian Kindred and Kevan Frost. He now manages his wife Lou Fellingham's solo career and plays keyboards in her live shows.

Michael Sandeman (1994–2014) was the keyboardist for the band. He has written songs such as What Would I Do?, and This Is What My God Is Like. Michael oversaw the worship training areas of Phatfish, including material for their 2006 training release Working As A Band and heading up seminars. In 2013 he launched his own consultancy service for Church worship teams called Worship Band Advice. He now works as a music teacher and producer, most recently producing albums for Brighton-based artist Melissa Hubert, and operating his own studio called North Brighton Recording.

Luke Fellingham (1994–2014) was the bassist for the band. He is known for his appearance in the way of a lengthy beard that has grown over the years. Luke set up a company with his brother Nathan entitled Luna Sound, which he oversees and operates out of his own studio in Brighton where he now works as a recording and mastering engineer.

Jos Wintermeyer (2009–2014) was part of the live crew for Phatfish for a few years but joined the band along with Ben Hall in early January 2009 as the rhythm guitarist. He previously worked with Phatfish as a guest musician; his first live appearance was in November 2007. He now runs the music team at Lifespring, Horsham.

Ben Hall (2009–2014) was the lead guitarist for the band. He worked with Phatfish since early 2008 before becoming a full-time member in 2009. Ben contributed to the development of the bands continuing rock influence. He now lives in London and works as a teacher.

History

Early years (1994–2000)
The band was formed under the name 'Purple Phatfish' by Dave Fellingham in Brighton in January 1994. Dave had a vision for a Christian group that would be excellent musically and be respected by Christians and non-Christians alike.

Musically the band was initially a jazz-funk/rap outfit at a time when Acid Jazz was very popular in England. Purple Phatfish spent much of the first year performing their own songs in secular music clubs, mainly in the Brighton area where they gained a considerable following on the local music scene. Most of the early songs were not blatantly Christian in content, but tackled contemporary issues with a Christian perspective. Rapper Rachel Head left the band at the end of 1994, and 'Purple Phatfish' became 'Phatfish'.

In the following few years, Phatfish gigged further afield, playing regularly in top London music clubs and in universities around the country. They were also in demand with churches all over the UK who would book them to play at youth events and outreaches. During this period they made a number of recordings which have recently been remastered and repackaged under the title An Audience with God.

In 1997, the band worked on some more explicitly worship-orientated songs, and released their first full album We Know the Story.

In mid-1998, guitarist Mike Blow and percussionist Adrian Watts left Phatfish. Guitarist Alan Rose joined, and the band started song writing again. Phatfish moved further away from the jazz-funk sound, and the new songs had a rockier edge. Demos were made with producer Alan Shacklock, and Phatfish subsequently signed with US label Pamplin and in spring 1999 Purple Through the Fishtank was recorded with them in Nashville. The album had a broad appeal and increased the profile of the band both in the UK and abroad; Phatfish started regularly travelling in Canada, the US and Europe. In 2000, Phatfish released an album containing some of their older music, titled An Audience With God.

2000s 
Recorded in the UK, the Heavenbound album has a recurring theme of Heaven and man's future with God. Heavenbound has been a best seller and received rave reviews in the Christian press. In Autumn 2001, Phatfish toured with Heavenbound all over the UK, as well as at events in Canada.

Three unplugged gigs in different parts of the UK were recorded for the 'Hope' album in January 2002. The gigs and subsequent album raised money for AIDS orphans in Africa through the charity Hope HIV. Special guests Stuart Townend, Kate Simmonds and Brian Houston joined Phatfish at the gigs. The 2006 DVD release There is a Day includes the Brighton unplugged gig.

Nothing But the Truth and was released in May 2003 following an extensive UK during which the songs had been honed. The band continued touring and playing at festivals through that summer and autumn, in the UK and Canada.

Guitarist Alan Rose departed in August 2003. The remaining four members took some time out and spent a year or so concentrating on other non-Phatfish projects. Nathan and Luke produced an album for Kingsway's Survivor label called Soul Sista. The three guys also worked on music for a dance production based at their church in Brighton.

Faithful – The Worship Songs featured fresh studio arrangements of many of their more 'congregational' worship songs.  "The Faithful Tour" took them across England and Scotland, supported by guitarist Dan Wheeler.

Drummer Nathan Fellingham was the driving force behind the album Trinity, released 2006. It is a compilation of tracks from many artists including Phatfish; the songs focusing on the Trinitarian nature of God.

In 2006, band member Lou Fellingham released her debut solo album Treasure, and has continued releasing acclaimed solo albums as well as continuing to work with Phatfish.

The band appeared several more times on the BBC's Songs of Praise. They also supported lead singer Lou and friend Stuart Townend on a Stu + Lou tour taking them to various locations around the UK.

At the end of 2006, a Phatfish resource CD called Working as a band was released. It gives practical teaching and advice for local church worship musicians, and explains some of the basics of making a cohesive band sound that will work in a church setting.

There Is A Day – The Video Collection was also released at the end of 2006, incorporating music videos, an unplugged concert and interview footage.

In July 2007 Phatfish released Guaranteed, the first to contain all-new material since 2003. Receiving positive reviews and high sales at Christian events, the album contains ten songs described as having "intricate but driving, compulsive rhythms".

Lead singer Lou Fellingham released her second solo album, Promised Land in May 2008. Keyboardist Michael Sandeman, also released his instrumental album Worship Reflections in May.

In December 2008, A Best of Phatfish compilation was released called 15 to celebrate their fifteen-year anniversary. The double CD features the best of their performance and congregational songs, and was described by Christian music journalist Tony Cummings as "a piece of British Christian music history".

In January 2009, Ben Hall and Jos Wintermeyer, guitarists, both officially joined Phatfish and the band immediately went into the studio to record the In Jesus album which was released that summer.

Final years 
In December 2010 Phatfish released a new compilation album titled Anthems for Worship, which is a collection of their most popular worship songs that are suitable for congregational use. The album featured remastered tracks and a couple for new recordings.

Recorded in their newly built studio during summer 2011, Higher featured more pop-orientated songs as well as more intimate tracks such as their new setting for the classic Hymn And Can It Be.

Phatfish toured the Higher album around UK venues through 2011 and 2012 and accompanied Lou on her solo tour in Autumn 2012.

In January 2014, Phatfish announced they would be performing two final farewell concerts, 20 years after their first tour. On 14 and 15 March, they played to emotional crowds at Wessex Christian Centre, and bowed out. They were joined on stage for some of the old songs by early guitarists Mike Blow and Alan Rose; the first time they'd played together in many years. The shows were recorded for their final (double) album 'Phatfish LIVE'.

Musical style

Phatfish's musical style generally consisted of a rock/pop sound, utilising the keyboards and guitars and upfront vocals of lead singer Lou Fellingham. The band always strived for musical creativity and played tight in a live setting. Phatfish used programming in both worship, concert and studio settings. The early songs had a much more jazz-funk feel, giving way over time to a rockier more mainstream sound.  Lyrically they sought to unpack biblical truths in an accessible way, without resorting to shallow clichés.

Songwriting

Mike Rimmer of Cross Rhythms noted in his review of Faithful - The Worship Songs that the "influence of the Phatfish guys on the British worship scene should not be underestimated. Whether as songwriters or as part of the Stoneleigh worship band, they have played a major part in the last 10 years." Phatfish have contributed many worship songs into the modern Church, nationally in Britain and internationally around the world.

Nathan Fellingham was the principal worship songwriter of the band, his works including Holy Holy, There Is A Day and Amazing God

Nathan Fellingham's Holy Holy is described by himself in an audio interview at New Word Alive as being their most popular tune that has "travelled furthest around the world". It also featured on Tim Hughes' When Silence Falls and The Livingstone Collective's Portrait of Worship. The band's songs feature on many compilation, live, studio and instrumental albums that are available internationally, with non-Phatfish versions of songs such as There Is A Day, Amazing God, and Awake Awake O Zion being available on iTunes.

The band's most critically acclaimed song is There Is A Day. Featuring on dozens of live worship albums, and three Phatfish releases, the song talks about the day of "Jesus' return", and its potent theological content is a talking point for many Christian musical lovers and reviewers.

Worship leading

Since their formation, Phatfish were called upon as a worship band to lead and assist others at conferences and their local church CCK. The band often led worship alongside high-profile worship leaders like Matt Redman, Kate Simmonds and Stuart Townend at Christian conferences around the UK and abroad. Lou Fellingham either led herself or was a backing vocalist to the worship leader. In addition, they offered practical advice about Christian music and leading worship on their Working As A Band double-disc CD and have often taught this material at worship seminars and one-day events.

The band featured on three albums which have won the coveted CBC Praise & Worship Album of the year award; two Stoneleigh albums Ruach and Beautiful Saviour, and Stuart Townend's Best of Stuart Townend Live.

They were regularly invited to come and help local church worship teams around the country and offer advice and ideas for how they can improve what they're doing.  Keyboard player Mike Sandeman has set up Worship Band Advice which is a booking service for local churches who would like to benefit from his experience.

Phatfish appeared leading worship or performing at numerous conferences and festivals such as Stoneleigh Bible Week, Newday, Soul Survivor, New Word Alive, Mission:Worship, Big Church Day Out, Forum UCCF Conference, Salt and Light Conference, re.vive, YC Newfoundland, Worship:Together, Spring Harvest, Greenbelt, Souled Out, Radiant, Together On A Mission, Mobilise, Soul By The Sea, Bible By The Beach, Keswick Convention, Bognor Regis Bible Week, Women Walking With God, Mandate, Cheltenham Bible Week, Festival Manchester and Together at Westpoint.

Origin of band name
The band was originally called "Purple Phatfish", a name that came from a small purple keyring featuring a little fat fish that blew air out of its mouth when you squeezed it. The keyring was given as a present by a friend and she suggested that Purple Fat Fish would be a good name for a band. A picture of the fish may be seen on the 'What's in a name?' page on the band's website.

Discography
Note: This is a list of actual Phatfish recordings and does not include the numerous other worship albums on which they have played.

1994 Purple Phatfish (three song demo, cassette only)
1995 River of Life (cassette only)
1996 Neworldisorder (six song EP)
1997 We Know the Story
1999 Purple Through the Fishtank
2000 An Audience with God (compilation with some re-recorded material)
2001 Heavenbound
2002 Hope – Unplugged Live
2003 Nothing But The Truth
2004 Faithful: The Worship Songs
2006 Trinity (compilation with other artists)
2006 Working As A Band (Music resource for Church musicians)
2006 There Is A Day – The Video Collection (DVD)
2007 Guaranteed
2008 15 – The Anniversary Collection
2009 In Jesus
2010 Anthems For Worship
2011 Higher
2014 PHATFISH LIVE

Other albums/discography Phatfish have featured in

Note: This is a list of recordings in which the band have appeared in. These are not actual Phatfish releases. It is not a comprehensive list.

1994 Ruach - Stoneleigh album
1995 Day Of Favour - "
1996 My First Love - "
1997 Loves Compelling Power
1998 Beautiful Saviour - "
1999 Covenant Of Grace - "
2000 Chosen From The Nations
2000 Praise Mix 2000 - Recorded at Christian event Spring Harvest
2000 Revive '00 - Dare To Believe - Stoneleigh youth event
2001 The Fathers Embrace
2001 Revive - Joy - Stoneleigh youth events
2001 In Christ Alone - Recorded at CCK, Brighton
2001 Revive '01 - Dreams and Visions - Stoneleigh youth event
2002 Newfrontiers - Live 2002 - Recorded at CCK, Brighton
2002 Soul Survivor Live 2002 - Glimpses Of Glory
2003 Does The Future Have A Church - A compilation of worship songs from previous albums *
2004 Newday 2004 - Recorded at Newfrontiers youth event
2004 The Passion Of God's Son - Recorded at Newfrontiers event 'Leadership '04
2005 Newday - You Reign - Recorded at Newfrontiers youth event '05 (backing for Matt Redman)
2005 The Power Of The Cross - Recorded at Newfrontiers event 'Leadership '05
2006 Treasure - Lou Fellingham's debut album
2006 Praise Is Rising - Recorded at Newfrontiers event 'Leadership '06
2006 Newday - Shout From The Roof - Recorded at Newfrontiers youth event '06 (backing band for Siyoli Lusaseni)

See Lou Fellingham article for more Phatfish contributions

Music videos

References

Phatfish – artist profile at Cross Rhythms
Word on the Web (Church Army) – Interview with Nathan Fellingham (Dec 2004)

External links

Lou Fellingham Official website
Interview with Phatfish at Premier.tv
STREETBRAND Magazine Interview
Worship Band Advice website
Melissa Hubert website
Luna Sound website
NBR website

English Christian musical groups
English rock music groups
Musical groups established in 1994
Musical groups disestablished in 2014
Musical groups from Brighton and Hove